Emem, or Emumu, is an Eastern Pauwasi language in Keerom Regency, Papua Province. It has only 25% lexical similarity with Zorop, the most distinct Eastern Pauwasi language.

North Emem and South Emem are quite distinct. North Emem is transitional into Zorop, and South Emem into Karkar.

Distribution
It is spoken in 5 villages in Web Subdistrict, namely Yuruf, Umuaf, Yambraf Satu, Yambraf Dua, and Semografi villages.

References

East Pauwasi languages
Languages of western New Guinea